Glasgow Central can mean:
Glasgow Central (UK Parliament constituency), a constituency of the House of Commons of the Parliament of the United Kingdom, from 1885 to 1997 and from 2005 to present
Glasgow Central Railway, a railway from Maryhill to Glasgow, Scotland 
Glasgow Central station, a railway station in Glasgow, Scotland